Smokescreen is the name of several different fictional characters in the Transformers robot superhero franchise.

Transformers: Generation 1

Smokescreen is one of the second year Autobot Cars in the Transformers series. His toy was remolded from Prowl and Bluestreak, itself originating from an earlier Japanese line named Diaclone. Smokescreen's vehicle mode was based on an actual existing car—a 1979 Nissan Fairlady Z race car in the Electramotive team livery. Team founder Don Devendorf's car was accurately recreated, except that his number 83 was changed to a 38.

Smokescreen's bio originally indicated that while he appeared calm and easy-going, he was in reality the closest thing the Autobots had to someone who thought like a Decepticon. He would cheat to win without hesitation, and often covers his true goals from his fellow Autobots. Autobot leaders use him as a spy amongst the ranks at times.

Marvel Comics
Smokescreen first appeared in issue 14 of the Marvel Transformers comic. Here, he was brought to life alongside Grapple, Hoist, Skids and Tracks via the downloading of their personalities and Sparks from storage. Bumblebee took all but Grapple on a tour of the surrounding area—but ended up in a trial by fire when the Decepticons tried to steal sonic energy from a rock concert. The group battled Starscream, Skywarp and Thundercracker, defeating them, but left when the humans accused them of sabotaging the concert.

After this, Smokescreen played more of a peripheral role, battling the Decepticons, but not having any major roles. He was one of the many casualties when trying to stop the Underbase-powered Starscream. He was not shown to be revived, but returned in the pages of the Transformers: Generation 2 comic, where he accompanied Grimlock on a disastrous raid on Jhiaxus' forces. After this, he battled against Jhiaxus forces under Optimus Prime's command—only to be killed by a squad of Jhiaxus' troopers alongside Ironhide.

The Smokescreen of the post-movie universe appeared in the Marvel UK comics, most prominently in the "Legacy of Unicron" arc. He and Inferno were dispatched to escort Wreck-Gar back to the planet Junk. There, they discovered it had been taken over by the severed head of Unicron. The two escaped to warn Rodimus Prime, leaving Wreck-Gar behind to free his people, with Inferno being badly injured by the mind-controlled bounty hunter Death's Head. The two arrived on Cybertron—only to discover that Unicron's puppets Cyclonus and Scourge had launched an all-out Decepticon assault. The Decepticons badly damaged the shuttle, and Smokescreen refused to leave his injured friend. Inferno had other ideas and bodily threw him through the windshield to safety, before crashing and killing as many Decepticons as he could. Smokescreen returned to Junk with Prime and the Dinobots, determined to avenge Inferno, and contributing to the Chaos-Bringer's eventual defeat.

Animated series
Smokescreen originally appeared in "Dinobot Island (Part 1)". Smokescreen was used quite frequently in season 2. The cartoon made use of his abilities—in "Auto Berserk", for example, he downed the Seekers with his disruptors, and in "The Key to Vector Sigma", his smoke saved the Autobots' super-fuel after Prowl's security detail was compromised. taking the starring role in the episode "The Gambler". This saw him strike a deal with a gambler named Bosch in order to save his fellow Autobots—he would win energon for Bosch if Bosch used some to restore the others. Predictably cheating his way to victory, he was caught and lost all his winnings. With the help of Devcon, he and Bosch ended up battling and defeating Astrotrain, Dirge and Ramjet. After this Bosh freed the other Autobots.

Smokescreen was not among the Autobots whose death were shown in The Transformers: The Movie, and did not appear in the post-movie Season Three, appearing only in the Japanese opening for season 3, as the movie was not shown in Japan at the time. Smokescreen also made a brief appearance in the first episode of Transformers: The Headmasters.

Other media
Smokescreen is one of the characters appearing in the unlicensed comic book Transformers Chronicles Book One by Hirofumi Ichikawa. This story has him working with the Autobot Axelerators against the Skyscorchers, facing Dreadwing, and being reformatted into the Generation 2 Decepticon jet Smokescreen.

Toys
 Generation 1 Autobot Car Smokescreen (1985)
A red/blue redeco of the Nissan Fairlady robot toy used for Prowl and Bluestreak.

 Alternators Smokescreen (2003)
Smokescreen was the first Transformer to be released in the highly anticipated Transformers: Alternators/Binaltech toy line by Hasbro/Takara. Smokescreen's alternate mode is a Subaru Impreza WRC (2003). Smokescreen captures a fantastic amount of detail from the real car while still providing plenty of poseability in robot form. Smokescreen includes an intercooler from on top of the engine that can be turned into an "Electro-Disruptor Rifle". The Alternators rear view mirror is inset and painted silver while the Binaltech is reflective and solid.
Smokescreen was still a racing version of a production car—this time, however, the 2003 Subaru Impreza World Rally Championship car, driven by Tommi Mäkinen. His character card explained that he had been revived by Subaru's STI tuning group, who had built his new body, and that he was more dedicated to dispelling fear and apprehension amongst his comrades than ever.
Smokescreen is very faithful to the original Generation 1 incarnation. He has many similarities beyond the name and the fact that he is a blue vehicle which makes him easily recognizable.
While the Alternator line only released one Smokescreen, the Binaltech line released two. They were very similar, but had a few minor differences to accurately depict the two distinct WRC cars: The number seven or eight was printed on the top and on the doors. The number seven version license plate is "S40WRT" while the number eight license plate reads "S30WRT" There is an image of a cartoon pig on the side view mirrors of only the number seven version. The number seven version of the car has the names of Solberg and Mills on the rear door windows while the number eight version has the names of Mäkinen and Lindström, indicating the names of the drivers of each respective car. Each name has the flag of that drivers' nationality next to it.
Smokescreen was later remolded into Silverstreak and Smokescreen GT. His bio indicates he still plays his morale boosting role within the Autobot ranks.
 Binaltech Smokescreen GT (2004)
In 2004, the seventh Binaltech character was released, as Smokescreen GT. Based on the first Binaltech incarnation of Smokescreen, BT-01, the GT version was modified to resemble the 2004 World Rally Championship Subaru Impreza. Changes to the mold included revised front bumper, grille and wheels, and deco changes included revised sponsor labels and driver details. Smokescreen GT also included a missile launcher accessory, and was available in variations with either "1" or "2" on the door. Smokescreen GT was not released into the Alternators toy line.
To explain the presence of the Smokescreen GT, the Binaltech story offers the following, also translated by Doug Dlin: "In conjunction with Smokescreen's volunteering, the EDC's Advanced Technologies Development Bureau conducted the customization and function expansion of a GT System-compatible model in an experimental base, using the latest BT-model body frame made by Subaru. The "life force" that is the source of a Transfomer's life is propagated through its entire body by a "laser core", which is at the center of a force field. The GT System separately contains this laser core outside the body in subspace storage, and by synchronously connecting with translink ports installed on each BT terminal, it is able to breathe life into each of the multiply duplicated personality data. Each unit's memory data undergoes integration processing after it returns from an operation."
 Titanium 3 inch Smokescreen (2006)
Smokescreen was released in 2006 as a non-transforming 3 inch tall member of the Transformers: Titanium line. His form is based on the Alternators version of Smokescreen. Because this toy lacks a vehicle mode, it did not require a license from the car maker like the Alternators version did.
 'Universe 25th Anniversary Series Smokescreen (2009)
A red redeco of Universe Deluxe Silverstreak with a racing livery faithful to the original G1 toy.
 Henkei! Henkei! C-21 Deluxe Smokescreen (2009)
The Japanese version of the Universe figure by Takara Tomy has the weapons remolded in chrome silver and the rear spoiler repainted in a metallic red finish. The number labels are also printed in a larger font.
 Masterpiece MP-19 Smokescreen (not yet released)
Like Masterpiece Prowl and Bluestreak, this Smokescreen figure is a faithful redesign of the original G1 Nissan Fairlady Z toy with modern articulation and details. Set for release on September 2013. No official pictures have been released yet, but Smokescreen is expected to be painted in his original #38 racing livery.
 War For Cybertron: Earthrise Smokescreen (2020): This Smokescreen toy is based on his G1 Cartoon appearance. He was released as part of the second wave of Earthrise deluxe class figures. His alternate mode is a modernized version of the Nissan 280Z S30. He was remolded and recolored into Prowl, Bluestreak, and Barricade later in the Earthrise subline.

Transformers: Generation 2

In addition to the appearance of the original Smokescreen in the Generation 2 comic, the 1994 Generation 2 toy line featured a different character with the name Smokescreen: a Decepticon who transformed into a fighter jet and combined with Dreadwing, who transformed into a stealth bomber.

Toys
 Generation 2 Dreadwing with SmokescreenA new mold. This toy was later redecoed into an unreleased Generation 2 Starscream, Beast Wars Second Starscream, Robots in Disguise Smokejumper and Robot Masters Smokesniper.

Transformers: Armada

The name Smokescreen is reassigned to an Autobot who transforms into an orange construction crane.  The name is unrelated to his personality or function, but his Japanese name in 'Micron Legend' is Grap; the Japanese name for G1 Grapple who also transforms into a construction crane.  However, due to copyright reasons the name Grapple could not be used.

His bio indicated that he was an Autobot who was always in the thick of battle — not because he enjoyed it, but because he can't be bothered thinking about complex tactical maneuvers. He was immensely strong, but sometimes this habit of rushing in without thinking rebounded against superior odds.

In Transformers: Armada, Hoist (Grap Super Mode in Japan) is the new name adopted by Smokescreen after he was rebuilt following severe damage at the hands of Megatron and the Requiem Blaster. He transforms into a white backhoe, and is partnered with the Mini-Con Refute.

Animated series
In the cartoon, Smokescreen is the first Autobot reinforcement to join the Autobots on Earth. In his first mission, he encountered Rad, Alexis and Carlos, who unwittingly foiled his attempt to rescue the Mini-Con Drill Bit. However, after he rescued them from Cyclonus, he revealed his role to them. Smokescreen served as one of Optimus Prime's most trusted soldiers, acting as the group's sniper. He put up the most resistance when Prime welcomed the double agent Scavenger into the group, eventually making up with him after he contributed to an Autobot victory.

Later, he was nearly killed when he sacrificed himself after to stop Megatron using the Requiem Blaster on the other Autobots. Megatron gunned him down at point-blank range, although Smokescreen refused to give up until the Decepticons had retreated. Only then did he allow himself to go offline, much to his comrades' grief. This was not the end for him, as he was rebuilt by Red Alert into a new and improved body. After this, he renames himself Hoist.

After nearly being killed by Megatron's requiem blaster, Smokescreen was rebuilt by Red Alert as Hoist. Hoist went on to have many further battles against the Decepticons, and survived the battles against Unicron.

Dreamwave Productions

In Dreamwave Productions's accompanying Armada comic, Smokescreen would play a smaller role than his animated counterpart. One of the first Autobots to appear, he was unable to prevent the fall of Cyber City to the Mini-Con enhanced Decepticons. One million years later, when the signal from the escaped Mini-Cons was received, he was one of the Autobots who journeyed to Earth under Optimus Prime. After battling the Decepticons and gaining his Mini-Con partner, he disappeared, revealed in issue #12 that he and Scavenger had been sent to an observation post in California. He was subsequently recalled to the Autobot base after Prime's disappearance — only to be confronted by a full-scale Decepticon assault. Scavenger and Smokescreen battled Megatron and Demolishor, only for Smokescreen to get shot in the head by Megatron at point blank range. Hot Shot, Red Alert and Scavenger subsequently avenged him by knocking Megatron into Unicron's gaping maw.

Although it was not clear if Smokescreen survived or not, Hoist appeared in the subsequent Transformers: Energon comics, indicating he had died at one point, making it likely that as in the animated continuity, Smokescreen was resurrected as Hoist.

Armada Hoist continued to appear among the Autobots in the Transformers: Energon comic series by Dreamwave. His back story was never fully explained, but he mentioned he had died at one point, indicating that as in the animated continuity, he was Smokescreen in a new body.

3H Enterprises
In the Transformers: Universe comic, Armada Smokescreen and Generation One Smokescreen were both been abducted from their home dimensions by Unicron, and were forced to fight each other to the death in gladiatorial combat. Armada Smokescreen prevails in the contest. Please note that the depictions of these two combatants are of the original G1 Smokescreen and the original Armada Smokescreen; the comic was written before the Universe Smokescreen toys were created.

Toys
 Armada Smokescreen with Liftor (2002)
A Deluxe class toy.

 Armada McDonald's Smokescreen (2002)
Combines with the other McDonald's Armada Autobots.

 Armada Hoist with Refute (2003)
The mold used for Armada Hoist was repainted and remolded into a Decepticon for the character of Universe Ransack. The mold first used for Armada Hoist was remolded again into Transformers: Cybertron Longrack, a homage to Beast Wars Neo Longrack.

 Armada Built to Rule Smokescreen with Liftor (2003)
 Universe Smokescreen with Liftor (2004)
Armada Smokescreen was repainted blue for Universe and released as part of a "Battle in a Box".  He and his Mini-Con Liftor fought against Ransack and his Mini-Con Refute.

Transformers: Cybertron

Smokescreen was the original name given to the Autobot who was based on the Galaxy Force character Autovolt, but later Hasbro changed their minds and called him Crosswise.

Fun Publications
Smokescreen appeared in the text story from Fun Publications called Force of Habit. This story explained where he was during the events of the Cybertron story. Ultra Magnus was the commander of various Autobot ships sent to other planets in search for the Cyber Planet Keys. He also served as captain of the Iron Hope which was crewed by Bonecrusher, Grimlock, Ironhide, Knock Out, Overcast, Prowl, Quickstrike, RipTide, Skyblast, Swoop, Wreckage and the Sky Scorcher Mini-Con Team.

Toys
 Cybertron Deluxe Smokescreen (2006)
Cybertron Smokescreen was released as a repaint of Cybertron Crosswise in colors based on his Generation 1 counterpart. The name Smokescreen was intended to be unveiled at a Transformers convention during early 2006 but never materialized. He was falsely rumored to be a remold of an Armada toy, likely to incorporate a Cyber Planet Key. The toy of Smokescreen is 13 centimeters long in vehicle mode, whereas a real Bugatti Veyron is 447 centimeters long, so the toy is at a scale of about 1:34. The toy stands about 14 centimeters tall, which means Smokescreen would stand about 481 centimeters or 15 feet 10 inches tall.
His head colors are more intended as an homage to Rad (Transformers) the Action Master.

Transformers Cinematic Universe

Smokescreen is the Autobot in charge of diversionary tactics. He's fully loaded with sonic burst weapons, magnetic smoke bombs and oil slicks designed to scramble Decepticon sensors.

IDW Publishing
Smokescreen appears in Transformers: Defiance by IDW Publishing. In issue #2 Smokescreen sides with Optimus Prime against Megatron's orders to counter-attack their invaders. In issue #3 Megatron learned that Optimus has broken into his room he sent Bumblebee, Camshaft, Cliffjumper, Jazz, Prowl and Smokescreen to arrest Optimus for treason. Optimus demanded to speak directly to Megatron, but when the group was traveling to Megatron's location they were ambushed by Barricade, Brawl, Crankcase, Frenzy, Starscream, Skywarp and Thundercracker who had orders to kill the lot of them. Smokescreen was able to cover Optimus and his group's retreat in the confusion of an explosion. In issue #4 Arcee, Bumblebee, Cliffjumper, Jazz and Smokescreen ambush Ironhide, who they believe works for Megatron, but Ironhide instead joins Optimus Prime's Autobots.

Smokescreen is among the Autobot forces who witness the launching of the Decepticon ship Nemesis.

In Reign of Starscream, the Decepticon Starscream barely makes it to the Nemesis on Mars before he runs out of power. His return is noted by the Autobot Cosmos, who alerts Arcee, Cliffjumper, Smokescreen, Camshaft and Air Raid. Aided by Thundercracker on the Nemesis Starscream recovers and sends the information Frenzy had gathered back to Cybertron just as Hardtop spots the Autobots closing on the Nemesis. When the Autobots attack the Decepticons Smokescreen is seemingly killed by Starscream.

In reality, Smokescreen survived and came to Earth successfully. However Smokescreen was captured and brainwashed by the anti-cybertronian group the Initiative. Smokescree is eventually freed from this brainwashing at the climax of Nefarious.

After being rescued from control by the Initiative, Armorhide, Blaze Master, Brawn and Smokescreen join the Autobots at the NEST base on Diego Garcia. Optimus Prime insists they spend time there recovering. However, Smokescreen, along with multiple Autobots, NEST members, and Theodore Galloway meet their ends at the hands of Shockwave, but he was not along with the Autobots who were giving graves as his fate is unknown.

Toys
All toys of this character (except the Revenge of the Fallen Legends figure) are officially licensed from General Motors.
 Transformers Fast Action Battlers Sonic Shock Smokescreen (2008)
A Deluxe-sized toy with simplified transformation for younger children. Repaint of Autobot Jazz.
 Transformers 3D Battle Cards Smokescreen (2007)
Smokescreen is among the characters which appeared in the Transformers 3D Battle Card Game by Wizards of the Coast. He is similar to Alternators Smokescreen.
 Revenge of the Fallen Deluxe Smokescreen (2009)
A redeco of the Jazz figure.
 Revenge of the Fallen Legends Smokescreen (2010)
A redeco of Universe Legends Rodimus packed together with Legends Starscream.

Transformers (Decepticon)

At the 2010 Tokyo Toy Show, Takara Tomy released a Decepticon version of Smokescreen as a homage to the Generation 2 incarnation. In keeping with the homage, both Smokescreen and Dreadwing sport Generation 2 Decepticon symbols.

Toys
 Transformers Voyager Dreadwing and Scout Smokescreen (2010)
A Tokyo Toy Show exclusive in Japan, this figure is a blue redeco of Scout Skystalker, while Dreadwing is a blue redeco of Voyager Mindwipe.

Aligned Continuity

In Transformers: Prime, Smokescreen is a young Autobot, he greatly admires Optimus Prime which makes him a loyal Autobot, even though he is a rookie, he is shown to be the joker of the group. He appears to have an aspiration of becoming a great warrior like Optimus where his ego occasionally annoys most of the other Autobots, but as the series goes on he develops into a loyal friend who thinks less about himself and more about his teammates including Bumblebee, Arcee, and Bulkhead. Aside from having a color scheme similar to G1 Jazz, Smokescreen still carries some elements from his original character, most notably the number "38" on the doors of his car mode. In the midpoint of season 3 Smokescreen receives a new paint job which makes him resemble his G1 counterpart even more, the exception being the 38's on the doors becomes 7's. His weapons include energon blasters in both his arms, along with his signature weapon the Phase Shifter which allows him to move between objects and stray immune to blaster fire. Many fans have considered him a variation of Hot Rod due to Smokescreen idolizing Optimus Prime and almost becoming the next prime.

Animated series
Smokescreen was a former student of Cybertron's Elite Guard during the Cybertronian War, and while he passed the training never had a formal graduation ceremony. He ended up becoming a guard at the Vault of Iacon where he guarded Alpha Trion during the final days of the war. Though initially unhappy with the assignment, he came to respect Alpha Trion's wisdom and considered him a valued mentor and friend. Trion apparently reciprocated the feeling of trust, as he shared with Smokescreen the knowledge that he had supported Optimus for the position of Prime, recommending him to the Autobot High Council. When  the Vault of Iacon was attacked, Smokescreen was the last defense willing to fight the Decepticons, which would be for the first time in his career, until everything went black. In reality, he was knocked out by Alpha Trion so he could store one of the Omega Keys within him as a means of keeping the key safe. He then woke up on a Decepticon ship. Smokescreen gave a Vehicon guard the slip and managed to enter a long-distance escape pod to Earth which returned him to stasis.

Predacons Rising
In the television movie conclusion Predacons Rising, Smokescreen witnesses Bumblebee's ceremony as he is promoted from scout to warrior by Optimus. As Optimus leaves Cybertron with Wheeljack to bring the AllSpark back to Cybertron, Ultra Magnus and Smokescreen partake in patrols to find Starscream, Shockwave and Predaking. However, when searching Magnus and Smokescreen encounter two more Predacons Skylynx and Darksteel. Though Smokescreen is able to hold his own against Darksteel, Skylynx severely wounds Magnus and almost kills him forcing Smokescreen to bridge Magnus to base as Ratchet returns to fix him. Smokescreen later accompanies Bumblebee, Bulkhead and Arcee as they look for answers and find Predaking who has abandoned the Decepticons but refuses to be considered as an Autobot. Predaking also refuses to help the Autobots look for his brothers so the group heads to the fortress Darkmount. Smokescreen also sits in Megatron's former high chair jokingly declaring himself "Emperor of Destruction" but moments later Unicron, in possessing of Megatron's body, arrives and attacks them forcing them to retreat to the Nemesis. Later the Autobots discover that Unicron is attempting to create an army of Terrorcons from the remains of the Predacons at Predaking's refuge, aiming to destroy Primus with them. Smokescreen tries to gather the remaining relics they have which include the 'Phase Shifter', 'Polarity Gauntlet' and 'Immobilizer' but Smokescreen is ambushed by Knock Out, who escaped captivity with Starscream, and placed back inside the wall until Knock Out betrays Starscream and frees him. During the final battle when the Predacons come to their aid, Smokescreen finally reveals to Bumblebee that he almost became a Prime . When the Nemesis was shot down the Autobots stepped outside ready to fight and were soon joined by the Predacons. Optimus and Wheeljack returned and joined the fight in which Unicron was defeated and Megatron was freed, though he abandoned his cause and exiled himself much to everyone's shock. Smokescreen was present when Optimus sacrificed himself to restore the AllSpark to Cybertron's core.

Robots in Disguise
Although, he didn't appear in the series, a statue of him was constructed in his honor following Cybertron's rebirth. However, when a new High Council came into power, Smokescreen was blacklisted for being a supporter of Optimus Prime. A picture shows his resemblance to his G1 counterpart.

Toys
 Prime Arms Micron AM-26 Deluxe Smokescreen (2012)
A Takara Tomy Japan-exclusive white remold of Deluxe Knock Out with a different head sculpt and a Micron figure that transforms into his bow. Changes to his mold include a rear spoiler and a redesigned rear end to accommodate the Micron in weapon mode. The figure comes unpainted with a foil sticker sheet in the package.

 Prime: Beast Hunters Cyberverse Legion Smokescreen w/ Chain Bolter 
 Prime: Beast Hunters Sky Claw w/ Smokescreen 
 Prime: Beast Hunters Smokescreen with Electronet Launcher''' (2013)
Comes with snap-off armor.
The mold for this figure is also used for the Transformers Collectors' Club exclusive Deluxe Barricade.

References

External links
 Toy Review Gallery of Alternators Smokescreen
 Toy Gallery of Universe Smokescreen
 Review of Armada Smokescreen
 Gallery for Armada Smokescreen
 Official Hasbro Alternator product page
 Hasbro instruction manual
 Toy Review of Binaltech Smokescreen GT
 Gallery of Binaltech Smokescreen
 Gallery of Alternators Smokescreen
 Gallery of Binaltech Smokescreen (Part 1)
 Gallery of Binaltech Smokescreen (Part 2)
 Gallery of Binaltech Smokescreen GT (Part 1)
 Gallery of Binaltech Smokescreen GT (Part 2)
 Smokescreen at the Transformers Wiki

Transformers characters
Fictional aircraft
Fictional gamblers
Fictional characters who can turn intangible
Articles about multiple fictional characters
Male characters in animated series
Male characters in comics
Male characters in film
Action film characters
Television characters introduced in 1985